"Talk to Me" is a song by Wild Orchid, and was the second single from their self-titled debut, Wild Orchid. The song achieved gold status in South Africa (with 25,000 copies sold).

Chart performance
"Talk to Me"  made dance chart history when it was the first single by a female group to enter the Billboard Hot Dance/Maxi Single Sales Chart at #10. After the single's huge success on the dance charts, it started receiving significant radio airplay. When the single was finally released commercially, the song's popularity had already started fading in the US. Nevertheless, sales were strong enough to push the single to land in the Billboard Hot 100 Singles Chart at #48, making it their most successful single in the US.  It also reached the Top 10 Singles Chart in Japan. The song also made very brief appearances at the lower segments of various European charts.

Music video
In the music video, Ferguson, Ridel and Sandstrom are shown singing in a recording booth and performing the song in front of dancers rehearsing dance moves and performing the song in front of many people. Although the video was originally filmed and released in 1997, the video was uploaded to YouTube on June 29, 2014. Since its release the video has been viewed over 75,000 times.

Track listings and formats
US CD, Maxi-Single
Talk To Me [Extended Album Mix] 5:13
Talk To Me [Junior Vasquez Deluxe Club Mix] 6:17
Talk To Me ["Humpty" Vission & Lorimer's West Coast Dub Mix] 6:19
Talk To Me [Stonebridge & Nick Nice Club Mix] 7:39
james tetik

US Vinyl, 12", Promo, Green
Talk To Me [Extended Album Mix] 5:13
Talk To Me [Jr. Vasquez Deluxe Club Mix] 6:17
Talk To Me ["Humpty" Vission + Lorimer's West Coast Party Mix] 5:37

References

Wild Orchid (group) songs
1997 singles
Dance-pop songs
Songs written by Antonina Armato
Song recordings produced by Ron Fair
1997 songs